In computer security, a register spring is a sort of trampoline. It is a bogus return pointer or Structured Exception Handling (SEH) pointer which an exploit places on the call stack, directing control flow to existing code (within a dynamic-link library (DLL) or the static program binary). This target code in turn consists of a call or jump such as "CALL EBX" or "JMP ESP", where the appropriate processor register was previously prepared by the exploit to point to where the payload code begins.

Sources
 

Computer security exploits